Ödön Tersztyánszky (6 March 1890 – 21 June 1929) was a Hungarian fencer and olympic champion in sabre competition. He won a gold medal in sabre individual and in sabre team at the 1928 Summer Olympics in Amsterdam.

Tersztyánszky was killed in a car accident outside Budapest.

References

1890 births
1929 deaths
Hungarian male sabre fencers
Olympic fencers of Hungary
Fencers at the 1924 Summer Olympics
Fencers at the 1928 Summer Olympics
Olympic gold medalists for Hungary
Olympic silver medalists for Hungary
Olympic bronze medalists for Hungary
Olympic medalists in fencing
Road incident deaths in Hungary
Medalists at the 1924 Summer Olympics
Medalists at the 1928 Summer Olympics
Hungarian male foil fencers